Valle del Risco Corregimiento, is a group of small rural communities in the Bocas del Toro Province of Panama. The biggest community is Valle del Risco, where there is a school and medical services.

To reach Valle Risco you must drive from Almirante, Bocas del Toro, passing high mountains and dangerous curves.

It was created by Law 5 of January 19, 1998. Its population as of 2000 was 3,422.

References

Corregimientos of Bocas del Toro Province